The Legal Marijuana Now Party is a political third party in the United States. The party’s platform includes abolishing the Drug Enforcement Administration and legalizing hemp and marijuana. As of 2023, the party has ballot access in Minnesota and Nebraska.

The Legal Marijuana Now Party was established in Minnesota in 1998 to oppose marijuana prohibition. In 1996, the Grassroots Party of Minnesota split, with some former members forming the Independent Grassroots Party. By 1998, members of the Independent Grassroots Party formed the Minnesota Legal Marijuana Now Party. In the 2010s the party began expansion attempts to other states, gaining presidential election ballot access in Iowa for the 2016 election by petition. The party continues expansion in the 2020s, gaining ballot access in Nebraska as the Nebraska Legal Marijuana NOW Party in 2021.

History

Background

The Minnesota Grassroots Party was formed in 1986 as a response to Ronald Reagan's War on Drugs.
In 1996 the party split, with some former members forming the Independent Grassroots Party for one election cycle.

Early Minnesota party (1998–2014)
In 1998, members of the Independent Grassroots Party formed the Minnesota Legal Marijuana Now political party. The party's name, according to Yippie Oliver Steinberg, a Grassroots Party founder, is attributed Dan Vacek saying "call it the Legal Marijuana Now Party and then every vote we get will be a referendum. Every vote we get will be indisputable evidence that there’s a voter that wants legal marijuana."

Expansion to other states

Nebraska expansion
The Nebraska Legal Marijuana NOW Party petitioned to be recognized as a major political party. To make the ballot, Legal Marijuana NOW Party needed valid signatures equal to at least one-percent of the total votes cast for governor in 2014, or 5,397 signatures statewide.
In July, 2016, volunteers turned in 9,000 signatures to the Nebraska Secretary of State. However, the Secretary of State said that half of the signatures were invalid, verifying only 4,353 signatures and falling short of the 5,397 needed. 
After failing to make it onto Nebraska ballots in 2016, the party began circulating petitions for 2020 ballot access for a Nebraska Legal Marijuana NOW Party in September, 2016.
The party planned to collect 15,000 signatures for their second attempt at gaining ballot access.

State party activity

Minnesota

In 2014, Dan Vacek ran for Minnesota Attorney General as the Legal Marijuana Now candidate and got 57,604 votes, qualifying the party to be officially recognized and to receive public funding from the state.

Minnesota Legal Marijuana Now nominated candidates by petition to appear on the ballot for the November 6, 2018 election.
Their candidate for State Auditor, Michael Ford, received 5.3% of the vote qualifying the party to be an official major party in the state. This gave Legal Marijuana Now candidates ballot access without having to petition.

In 2020, the Minnesota Legal Marijuana Now candidate for United States Senator received 190,154 votes, more than any other such third party candidate in the U.S. During the 2020 election campaign, Democratic Party leaders said that the Legal Marijuana Now Party made it harder for Democratic candidates to win in Minnesota. A St. Cloud Times analysis of votes cast in the 2020 general election in Minnesota found that Legal Marijuana Now candidates might have helped DFL candidates in swing districts, by pulling a larger number of votes from Republican candidates.

Paula Overby was nominated by Minnesota Legal Marijuana Now Party, in 2022, to run for U.S. Representative from the 2nd congressional district. Overby, an information technology director, had previously been nominated by Legal Marijuana Now for the 2nd district, in 2020, after candidate Adam Weeks' untimely death. Overby’s platform included marijuana legalization and universal Medicare. On October 5, 2022, Overby died during recovery in a hospital following emergency surgery for a heart valve condition. Minnesota Secretary of State Steve Simon stated that Overby's name would remain on the ballot, and the election would go ahead as scheduled. Without remedy for replacing their deceased nominee, under state law, Legal Marijuana Now Party encouraged supporters to cast their votes for Overby. The dead candidate won 10,728 votes in the race.

Scholars have credited the work of Minnesota Legal Marijuana Now with motivating the state Democratic Party to embrace the cause of cannabis legalization, after 2018.

Nebraska

On April 21, 2021, Legal Marijuana NOW gained official recognition as a state political party in Nebraska, earning the party ballot access for their candidates, and allowing Legal Marijuana NOW Party to register voters.

Nebraska Legal Marijuana NOW Party ran more candidates for statewide offices, in 2022, than the Nebraska Democratic Party recruited. Larry Bolinger was nominated by Legal Marijuana NOW to run for Nebraska Attorney General in 2022. Bolinger, who entered public work by serving a term on the Alliance Planning Commission, focused on legalization of marijuana and expanding drug courts.

In the 2022 race, Bolinger received 188,648 votes, more than 30 percent, the highest percentage for a statewide Nebraska candidate running outside the two major parties in 86 years, when independent George Norris was reelected to U.S. Senate, in 1936. Bolinger was one of the top two third party vote-getters, in the US, in 2022.

U.S. presidential candidates

In 2016, Legal Marijuana Now placed their presidential candidates, Dan Vacek and Mark Elworth,  on the ballot in two states, Iowa and Minnesota. And as a write-in candidate nationwide.

Rudy Reyes was nominated by the Legal Marijuana Now Party, in 2020, to run for Vice-president of the United States, but the campaign was postponed until 2024.

Electoral history

Minnesota 1998—2016 federal and statewide office electoral history

Minnesota 2018—2022 federal and statewide office electoral history

Nebraska federal and statewide office electoral history

2016 U.S. presidential election

Platform

The Legal Marijuana Now Party's platform centers around marijuana legalization, including hemp legalization. The party has advocated legalizing the home cultivation of marijuana and expunging past cannabis convictions. It has also advocated broader anti-drug prohibition policies including abolishing the Drug Enforcement Administration and banning employee drug testing.

The party defines its platform as the United States Bill of Rights in its constitution.

Structure and composition

Movement
Grassroots organizations are associated with bottom-up rather than top-down decision making. The Legal Marijuana Now Party seeks to engage ordinary people in political discourse to the greatest extent possible.

Leadership
All decisions on important organizational and financial subjects must be reached by a leadership Head Council, which consists of Legal Marijuana Now Party members with at least three consecutive years participation in the party and officers elected by the members at an annual convention held in June.

State and local chapters

References

External links
Legal Marijuana Now Party (United States)
facebook.com/LMN.USA
State branches
Minnesota Legal Marijuana Now Party

facebook.com/LMN.Minnesota
Nebraska Legal Marijuana NOW Party
facebook.com/MJPNE

1998 establishments in the United States
Cannabis law reform organizations based in the United States
Cannabis political parties of the United States
Drug policy organizations based in the United States
Single-issue political parties
Political parties established in 1998
Political parties in the United States
Progressive parties in the United States
Social democratic parties in the United States